Andrej Martin and Hans Podlipnik Castillo were the defending champions but chose not to defend their title.

Sadio Doumbia and Fabien Reboul won the title after defeating Sergio Galdós and Facundo Mena 6–3, 7–6(7–4) in the final.

Seeds

Draw

References

External links
 Main draw

Banja Luka Challenger - Doubles
2019 Doubles